Waking Up the Town is a 1925 American silent comedy film directed by James Cruze and written by Frank Condon and James Cruze. The film stars Jack Pickford, Claire McDowell, Alec B. Francis, Norma Shearer, and Herbert Prior. The film was released on April 14, 1925, by United Artists.

Plot
As described in a film magazine review, a garage employee in a small town has an inventive mind, and tries to interest a banker in a project to harness waterfalls for energy. He becomes discouraged. Through the kind assistance of the garage owner, he puts his idea over, and wakes up the town. He has a romance with the granddaughter of his benefactor.

Cast

Preservation
The film is preserved in the Library of Congress Collection.

References

External links

1925 films
American silent feature films
American black-and-white films
1920s English-language films
United Artists films
Films directed by James Cruze
Silent American comedy films
1926 comedy films
1926 films
1925 comedy films
1920s American films